Fretzdorf station is a railway station in the municipality of Fretzdorf, located in the Ostprignitz-Ruppin district in Brandenburg, Germany.

References

Railway stations in Brandenburg
Buildings and structures in Ostprignitz-Ruppin